Jasmin Tabatabai (born 8 June 1967 in Tehran, Iran, is a German actress and singer.

Biography 
Jasmin Tabatabai's mother is German, and her father is Iranian. She was born and raised in Tehran until the 1979 Islamic Revolution, at which point she migrated with her mother to Germany. After her completion of school, she studied drama in the arts college in Stuttgart.

Career 
She was discovered for the screen 1992 as main character in the Swiss feature film Children of the Open Road, what brought her the award as best actress at the Amiens Film Festival in France. During her early work as actress in Berlin, she co-founded the band Even Cowgirls Get the Blues as singer and songwriter.

The 1997 German film Bandits exposed Jasmin Tabatabai to a larger audience. In addition to her acting role in the film, she also wrote and performed many of the songs for the soundtrack. The record for the film sold more than seven hundred thousand copies. She also voiced Megara in the German dub of Hercules.

Tabatabai's first album as a solo artist, Only Love, was released in 2002 along with the single After You Killed Me. Soon after she founded her own record label, polytrash. She also composed songs for the soundtrack of the 2004 movie Iron Jawed Angels together with then-husband Tico Zamora.

Personal life 

In December 2001, Tabatabai met American musician Tico Zamora. On 3 December 2002 she gave birth to their first and only child, a daughter named Angelina Sherri Rose. She and Zamora married on 1 June 2003 and separated by summer 2006. Their divorce was finalized in 2008.

She has been in a relationship with actor Andreas Pietschmann since summer 2007. They have two children: a daughter, Helena Leila (born 5 July 2009), and a son, Johan Anton (born 13 August 2013). Tabatabai and Pietschmann reside in Berlin.

Awards 
1997: Bavarian Film Award, Best Film Score

Partial filmography 
 Kinder der Landstrasse (1992)
 Dann eben mit Gewalt (1993, TV film)
 The Meds (1995)
 The Cleaning Ladies Island (1996)
 Bandits (1997)
  (1999)
 Split Second (1999, TV film)
 Gripsholm (2000)
 No Place to Go (2000) as Meret
  (2001)
 Fremde Haut (2005)
 Atomised (2006)
 Four Minutes (2006)
 Fay Grim (2006)
 Blood and Chocolate (2007)
 Messy Christmas (2007)
 Der Baader Meinhof Komplex (2008)
 Germany 09 (2009)
 Altiplano (2009)
 Mitra (2009)

Music
 1997: Bandits soundtrack
 2002: Only Love
 2004: Iron Jawed Angels soundtrack
 2007: Blood and Chocolate soundtrack
 2007: I ran

Jasmin Tabatabai & David Klein Orchester
 2011: Eine Frau
 2016: Was sagt man zu den Menschen, wenn man traurig ist?

References

External links
 
 Official homepage

Living people
1967 births
German film actresses
Iranian film actresses
People from Tehran
Iranian emigrants to Germany
German television actresses
20th-century German actresses
21st-century German actresses